McManus is an Irish  surname. It is derived from the Irish Gaelic "Mac Mághnais", in modern Irish "McMaghnuis" which means "Son of Magnus". Its earlier origin is from the Latin "magnus", meaning "great". The Normans used it to honour Charlemagne (742–814), as Carolus Magnus (Charles the Great). Variant spellings of the name include MacManus, Manus and MacManners. The English form, Moyne, is also found in Ulster. In Scotland it is a sept of Clan Colquhoun.

There are two principal septs of the name in Ireland:
One descends from Maghnus (d. 1181), son of Turlough Mór O'Conor, High King of Ireland (1119–1156); this branch belonged to Kilronan in the county of Roscommon in the province of Connacht.
The second sept was a branch of the Maguires, who descend from Magnus, son of Donn Maguire (Donn Mag Uidhir), Chief of the Kingdom of Fermanagh (d. 1302). This family lived on the shores of Lough Erne, in what is now County Fermanagh.

Notable people with the surname include:

 Abbie McManus (born 1993), English association football player
 Alan McManus (born 1971), Scottish professional snooker player
Alice McManus :(born 1997) talented dental hygienist, professional ringuette goaltender
 Alex McManus, American musician
 Allan McManus (born 1974), Scottish footballer
 Brandon McManus (born 1991), American football placekicker 
 Danny McManus (born 1965), American and Canadian football quarterback
 Declan McManus (born 1994), Scottish footballer
 Doyle McManus (born ), American journalist
 Edward Joseph McManus (1920–2017), American politician and jurist
 Emily Julian McManus (1865-1918), Canadian poet, author, and educator
 Erwin McManus (born 1958), lead pastor of Mosaic Church of the emerging church movement
 Frank McManus (disambiguation), several people
 George McManus (disambiguation), several people
 Gerard McManus (born 1960), Australian journalist
 Heather Ross-McManus (born 1973), Canadian trampoline gymnast
 J. F. A. McManus (Joseph Forde Anthony McManus, 1911–1980), Canadian pathologist
 J. P. McManus (John Patrick McManus, born 1951), Irish businessman and racehorse owner
 James McManus (disambiguation), several people named James and Jim
 Jane McManus, better known under her married names Jane Storm and Jane Cazneau (1807–1878), American journalist
 Jeanne McManus,(Born 1995) talented chef, wife and police officer 
 John McManus (disambiguation), several people
 Liz McManus (born 1947), Irish Labour Party politician
 Louis McManus (1898–1968), American television engineer, film editor, and designer
 Mark McManus (1935–1994), Scottish actor best known in Taggart
 Martin McManus (politician), (born 1967) Australian politician 
 Marty McManus (1900–1966), American infielder in Major League Baseball
 Michael McManus (disambiguation), several people named Michael and Mick
 Michaela McManus (born 1983), American actress
 Michelle McManus (born 1980), Scottish singer
 Michelle McManus (Michigan politician) (born 1966), member of the Michigan Senate
 Patrick McManus (disambiguation), several people named Pat or Patrick
 Peter McManus (1829–1859), Irish recipient of the Victoria Cross
 Ronald McManus (Ronald Patrick Ross McManus), British singer using the pseudonym David Ross
 Rove McManus (John Henry Michael McManus, born 1974), Australian variety show host, comedian, and owner of Roving Enterprises
 Sammy McManus (1911–1976), Irish-Canadian professional ice hockey player
 Sara McManus (born 1991), Swedish curler
 Sara McManus (field hockey) (born 14 August 1993), Canadians field hockey player
 Sean McManus (disambiguation), several people
 Shaun McManus (born 1976), Australian rules footballer
 Shawn McManus (born 1958), American artist
 Stephen McManus (born 1982), professional footballer
 Thomas McManus (disambiguation), several people
 Tim McManus, fictional character from Oz
 Tony McManus (disambiguation), several people
 William McManus (1780–1835), U.S. Congressman from New York
 Steven McManus  (born 1970), Drummer and author

See also 
 McManus Galleries, Gothic Revival-style building with a museum and art gallery
 MacManus

References

Surnames of Irish origin
Anglicised Irish-language surnames
Patronymic surnames
Surnames from given names